KSQD (90.7 FM) is a radio station licensed to serve the community of Santa Cruz, California. The station is owned by Natural Bridges Media, and airs a variety format.

The station was assigned the call sign KLSN by the Federal Communications Commission on May 1, 1998. It changed its call sign to KJOL on December 26, 2000, to KSRI on April 23, 2001, and to KSQD on December 18, 2018.

Natural Bridges acquired KSRI from Educational Media Foundation in May 2018. EMF had operated KSRI as an Air1 affiliate. Natural Bridges included several hosts from KUSP, a defunct public radio station in Santa Cruz.

References

External links
 Official Website
 

SQD
Radio stations established in 2001
2001 establishments in California
Variety radio stations in the United States
Community radio stations in the United States
Santa Cruz, California